Dee Ward Hock (March 21, 1929 – July 16, 2022) was the founder and CEO of the Visa credit card association.

Career 
Hock was born in North Ogden, Utah, in 1929 and attended Weber State University where he graduated in 1949. In 1968, Hock was a vice president of National Bank of Commerce, a local Seattle, Washington bank that was franchised by Bank of America to issue its credit card brand, BankAmericard. Through a series of unlikely accidents, Hock helped invent and became chief executive of the credit system that became VISA International. Early on, he convinced Bank of America to give up ownership and control of their BankAmericard credit card licensing program, forming a new company, National BankAmerica, that was owned by its member banks. The name was changed to Visa in 1976.

In May 1984, Hock resigned his management role with Visa, retiring to spend almost ten years in relative isolation working a  parcel of land on the Pacific coast to the west of Silicon Valley. He was inducted into Junior Achievement's U.S. Business Hall of Fame in 1991, and the Money magazine hall of fame in 1992.

In his 1991 Business Hall of Fame acceptance speech Hock explained:

Hock had built Visa as a deliberately decentralized organization. In March 1993, Hock gave a dinner speech at the Santa Fe Institute where, based on his experiences founding and operating Visa International, he described systems that are both chaotic and ordered, using the term "chaordic" from the words "chaos" and "order".

In February 1994, Hock accepted a grant from the Joyce Foundation for his travel expenses to study the possibilities of implementing chaordic organizations. The non-profit Alliance for Community Liberty was formed in 1994 by Hock to develop, disseminate and implement these new concepts of organization, and was renamed The Chaordic Alliance in 1996.In spring 2001 The Chaordic Commons - a 501c3 nonprofit organization - was formed to supersede the Chaordic Alliance. 

Hock died on July 16, 2022 at the age of 93.

Impact on organization development
In addition to his career in the financial industry, Hock has been active in developing new models of social and business organization. He has been particularly interested in forms of organization that are neither rigidly controlled nor anarchic, a hybrid form he terms chaordic.

Hock has authored a book on the subject, Birth of the Chaordic Age (1999) with an edition named One from Many: VISA and the Rise of Chaordic Organization (2005) which includes two new chapters.

Personal life 
Hock married his high school girlfriend, Ferol Delors Cragun, when he was 20. She died in 2018. At the time of his death, he was survived by two children, seven grandchildren, and seven great grandchildren.

References

External links
Plazm interview
Famous Quotes from Dee Hock

1929 births
2022 deaths
American financial businesspeople
People from North Ogden, Utah
Cooperative organizers